Karl Magnus Augustson (born 14 Match 1973) is a Swedish Olympic sailor. He finished 7th in the Soling event at the 2000 Summer Olympics together with Hans Wallén and Johan Barne.

Augustson has sailed in multiple America’s Cups, competing for Victory Challenge in 2003, Luna Rossa Challenge in 2007 and Artemis Racing in the 2013 America's Cup.

References

Swedish male sailors (sport)
Olympic sailors of Sweden
Royal Gothenburg Yacht Club sailors
Sailors at the 2000 Summer Olympics – Soling
Artemis Racing sailors
Luna Rossa Challenge sailors
2013 America's Cup sailors
2007 America's Cup sailors
2003 America's Cup sailors
1973 births
Living people